Üçüncü Tala (known as Dombabinə until 2015) is a village and municipality in the Zaqatala Rayon of Azerbaijan. It has a population of 2,042. The municipality consists of the villages of Dombabinə, Mamqabinə, Bozbinə, Mücəkbinə, Masqarabinə, Həsənbinə, and Xanmədbinə.

References

External links
 

Populated places in Zaqatala District